Dimyristoylphosphatidylcholine is a phosphatidylcholine, a kind of phospholipid.  Along with other lipids, it can be used to prepare liposomes.

References

 Phosphatidylcholines